Rodney Steps In is a 1931 British comedy film directed by Guy Newall and starring Richard Cooper, Elizabeth Allan, Walter Piers and Leo Sheffield. A carefree aristocrat becomes involved with a woman suspected of murder - and assists her in proving her innocence.

References

External links

1931 films
1931 comedy films
Films directed by Guy Newall
Films shot at Twickenham Film Studios
British comedy films
British black-and-white films
1930s British films